"People" is a song by Cameroonian American singer Libianca, released on December 6, 2022. The lyrics of the song are inspired by Libianca's personal experience with depression.

Track listings

Charts

Certifications

References

2022 songs
2022 singles